The International Visitor Leadership Program (IVLP) is a professional exchange program funded by the U.S. Department of State's Bureau of Educational and Cultural Affairs.  The mission of IVLP is to offer current and emerging international leaders the opportunity to experience the richness and diversity of American political, economic, social and cultural life through carefully designed exchanges that reflect participants’ professional interests and the public diplomacy objectives of the United States government.

The exchange brings up to 5,000 professional emerging leaders from around the world to the United States each year for programs of up to three weeks. The program is nomination only by staff at U.S. Embassies.

History 
In 1940, Nelson Rockefeller was named the Coordinator of Commercial and Cultural Affairs for the American Republics. He initiated the exchange of persons program with Latin America, inviting 130 Latin American journalists to the United States and recognized as the first exchange under what would become the IVLP. In 1948 representative Karl E. Mundt and Senator H. Alexander Smith marshaled the Informational and Educational Exchange Act, also known as the Smith-Mundt Act which was passed by the 80th United States Congress and approved by President Harry S. Truman.  During a time when Americans grew increasingly concerned about Soviet propaganda, the purpose of the Smith-Mundt was "to promote a better understanding of the United States in other countries, and to increase mutual understanding between the people of the United States and the people of other countries" though educational and cultural exchanges. From this legislation birthed the Foreign Leaders Program, which was eventually consolidated into the International Visitor Program (IVP) in 1952.  In 2004, the IVP was renamed the International Visitor Leadership Program (IVLP).

Goals 
The purpose of the IVLP is to:
 cultivate lasting relationships between current and emerging professionals around the world and their American counterparts
 provides opportunities for foreign opinion makers to gain firsthand knowledge about U.S. society, culture and politics

Notable alumni 

The following tables list the 338 current and former chiefs of state and heads of government who have participated in the International Visitor Leadership Program.

East Asia and Pacific

Europe

North Africa, Near East, South Asia and Central Asia

Sub-Saharan Africa

Western Hemisphere

Agencies involved 
The IVLP functions through a cooperative agreement with several National Program Agencies and Global Ties U.S., comprising organizations in 45 states, that arrange the itineraries for IVLP exchange participants.
CRDF Global
Cultural Vistas
FHI360
Institute of International Education
Meridian International Center
Mississippi Consortium for International Development
Graduate School USA
World Learning

References

External links 
IVLP Overview
Global Ties U.S.

United States Department of State
Bureau of Educational and Cultural Affairs
United States diplomatic programs